Hamadryas arethusa is a species of cracker butterfly in the family Nymphalidae. It is found in South America.

Some authors  consider it to be a synonym of Hamadryas laodamia.

References

Hamadryas (butterfly)
Butterflies described in 1775
Taxa named by Pieter Cramer